Matt Cross (born 28 April 1981) is an Australian former professional rugby league footballer who last played for the Manly-Warringah Sea Eagles in the National Rugby League. Cross previously played for the Penrith Panthers and the Gold Coast. Cross is the brother of Ben Cross.

Playing career
Cross made his first grade debut for Penrith in round 20 of the 2005 NRL season against North Queensland at the Willows Sports Complex.  In his first two seasons with Penrith the club missed the finals.  In the 2007 NRL season, Cross played 9 games as the club finished last on the table.

In 2008, Cross joined the Gold Coast but only played three games for the club.  Cross spent the 2009 NRL season with the Melbourne Storm after the Titans agreed to an early release.

Cross then joined the Manly-Warringah Sea Eagles in 2010 where he played 16 games and scored 3 tries for his new club.  At the end of 2010, Cross was released by Manly and this would prove to be his last season in first grade.

References

External links
Gold Coast Titans profile
NRL profile

1981 births
Living people
Australian rugby league players
Gold Coast Titans players
Manly Warringah Sea Eagles players
Melbourne Storm players
Penrith Panthers players
Rugby league players from Wagga Wagga
Rugby league props
Rugby league second-rows
Sunshine Coast Sea Eagles players